The 2018–19 WRU Championship was the seventh season of the WRU Championship, the second tier of club rugby in Wales run by the Welsh Rugby Union. It was be the third season to feature 12 teams, reduced from 14 in previous seasons. For this season, "ring-fencing" was abolished and the winner would play-off against the 12th placed team in the 2018–19 Principality Premiership at a neutral venue to determine the 12th team for the 2019–20 season. The competition was won by Pontypool for the third consecutive year and completed the season unbeaten for the second year running. The bottom four clubs relegated were Bedlinog, Newbridge (both to 1 East), Newcastle Emlyn (to 1 West) and Rhydyfelin (to 1 East Central).

Structure 
Each team in the Championship will play each other twice on a home and away basis for a total of 22 matches played each. The team with the most points at the end of the season will be declared the winners. Provided that the champion club holds an 'A-License', they will play-off against the 12th placed team in the 2018-19 Principality Premiership at a neutral venue to determine the 12th team for the 2019–20 season. The bottom four clubs at the end of the season will be relegated to Division 1 (based on geographical location).

Teams 
At the end of last season, Skewen and Glynneath were both relegated to Division 1 West Central. The winners of each Division 1 entered into playoffs to decide the remaining two places. The winners of the two Eastern divisions faced each other as did the winners of the two Western divisions. The winners were East Central champions Ystrad Rhondda and West Central champions Maesteg Quins who beat Brynmawr and Felinfoel respectively. Both clubs were making their debuts in the competition.

Promotion play-offs 

Ystrad Rhondda won 75–36 on aggregate.

Maesteg Quins won 53–33 on aggregate.

Standings

References

External links 
 

Welsh Championship
2018–19 in Welsh rugby union
Wales